Gordon Thompson Jr. (December 28, 1929 – July 5, 2015) was a United States district judge of the United States District Court for the Southern District of California.

Education and career

Born in San Diego, California, Thompson received a Bachelor of Science degree from the University of Southern California in 1951 and a Bachelor of Laws from Southwestern University School of Law (now Southwestern Law School) in 1956. He was a deputy district attorney of San Diego County from 1957 to 1960. He was in private practice in San Diego from 1960 to 1970.

Federal judicial service

Thompson was nominated by President Richard Nixon on October 7, 1970, to the United States District Court for the Southern District of California, to a new seat created by 84 Stat. 294. He was confirmed by the United States Senate on October 13, 1970, and received his commission on October 16, 1970. He served as Chief Judge from 1984 to 1991. He assumed senior status on December 28, 1994 and served in that capacity until his death on July 5, 2015.

References

Sources
 

1929 births
2015 deaths
People from San Diego
University of Southern California alumni
Southwestern Law School alumni
Judges of the United States District Court for the Southern District of California
United States district court judges appointed by Richard Nixon
20th-century American judges